Christopher Bengtsson (born October 19, 1993) is a Swedish professional ice hockey player who currently plays for IF Björklöven of the HockeyAllsvenskan (Allsv).

Playing career
Bengtsson previously played for Färjestad BK at the under-20 level and for Huddinge IK at the under-18 and under-20 level. In 2012 Bengtsson signed with Modo Hockey and split the season between the J20 SuperElit and the Swedish Hockey League.

On November 21, 2013, Modo signed Bengtsson to a two-year contract extension, keeping him with the team initially until the end of the 2015–16 SHL season.

Career statistics

References

External links

1993 births
Living people
AIK IF players
IF Björklöven players
Färjestad BK players
KalPa players
Modo Hockey players
Rögle BK players
Södertälje SK players
Swedish ice hockey centres
Ice hockey people from Stockholm